The 2016–17 season was AFC Bournemouth's second consecutive season in the Premier League and their 127th year in existence. That season Bournemouth participated in the Premier League, FA Cup and Football League Cup.

The season covers the period from 1 July 2016 to 30 June 2017.

First-team squad

Out on loan

Statistics

Appearances and goals

 

|}

Transfers

In

Out

Total incoming: £18,000,000

Loans in

Loans out

Pre-season friendlies
On 27 May 2016, it was announced that Bournemouth would travel to the Madejski Stadium on 29 July 2016 to play Reading. On 3 June 2016, it was announced that Bournemouth would play League Two side Portsmouth on 23 July 2016 and that they would also host a fixture against Cardiff City. On 14 June 2016, a friendly against Spanish side Valencia was announced. On 29 June 2016, it was announced that Bournemouth would once again visit the United States for a pre-season tour with a fixture against Minnesota United on 20 July 2016.

Competitions

Overview

{| class="wikitable" style="text-align: center"
|-
!rowspan=2|Competition
!colspan=8|Record
|-
!
!
!
!
!
!
!
!
|-
| Premier League

|-
| FA Cup

|-
| EFL Cup

|-
! Total

Premier League

League table

Results summary

Results by matchday

Results
On 15 June 2016, the fixtures for the forthcoming season were announced.

FA Cup

EFL Cup

References

AFC Bournemouth
AFC Bournemouth seasons